Meet the Stewarts is a 1942 American romantic comedy directed by Alfred E. Green, which stars William Holden and Frances Dee. It was Holden's final film prior to his entering military service for World War II, and he was granted a temporary deferment in order to complete filming. The working title of the picture was Something Borrowed.

Premise
A socialite accustomed to luxury has to live on her blue-collar husband's salary.

Cast

References

External links
 
 
 
 

1942 films
1942 romantic comedy films
American black-and-white films
American romantic comedy films
Columbia Pictures films
Films about marriage
Films directed by Alfred E. Green
1940s American films